The Clarence Burgin House is a historic house at 95 President's Lane in Quincy, Massachusetts.  The -story wood-frame house was built c. 1900 by Clarence Burgin, a bank executive and father of Quincy Mayor Thomas S. Burgin.  It is one of the city's finest examples of a gambrel-roofed Colonial Revival house.  Notable features include the gambrel-roof gable dormer above the main entry, and the wraparound porch with multi-columned Greek-style projection.

The house was listed on the National Register of Historic Places in 1989.

See also
National Register of Historic Places listings in Quincy, Massachusetts

References

Houses in Quincy, Massachusetts
Colonial Revival architecture in Massachusetts
Houses completed in 1900
National Register of Historic Places in Quincy, Massachusetts
Houses on the National Register of Historic Places in Norfolk County, Massachusetts